The Brownlow Medal (formally the Charles Brownlow Trophy) is an individual award given to the player judged fairest and best in the Australian Football League (AFL) during the regular season. Determined by votes cast by the officiating umpires after each game, it is considered the highest honour for individual players in the AFL.

The medal has been awarded every year since 1924, with the exception of an intermission from 1942–1945 due to World War II. As of 2021, the Brownlow Medal has been awarded 108 times to 89 players in 94 medal counts.

Winners by season

 
 
 

 
 
 

Notes:

As a mark of respect to soldiers fighting overseas in World War II, the medal was not awarded during 1942–1945.

Ineligible players who polled the most votes
A player guilty of an offence deemed worthy of a suspension by the AFL's disciplinary tribunal for serious on-field offences is ineligible to win the Brownlow Medal. Suspended players have tallied the highest number of votes for the award on three occasions. In the third of those cases, Jobe Watson, who won in 2012, was later found guilty of breaching WADA's anti-doping code in the 2012 season, and was retrospectively ruled ineligible by the AFL Commission in November 2016.

Multiple winners
The following players have won the Brownlow Medal multiple times.

Voting systems

Since 1924, the voting system for the Brownlow has changed three times.

From 1930 to 1980, a countback system was used to determine the winner in the event of a tie. In 1930, Judkins was awarded the medal as he had played in the fewest games.

From 1931 to 1980, with the introduction of 3-2-1 voting, the winner was the player with the most three-vote games. In 1980, the countback system was removed, and in the event of a tie, players have been considered joint winners. In 1989, the then VFL awarded retrospective medals to all players who had tied but lost on countback prior to 1980.

Brownlow wins by clubs

See also
Brownlow Medal

Notes

External links
Brownlow winners list from AFL Tables
Brownlow Medal Winners interactive visualization

 
Brownlow
Lists of players of Australian rules football